Walter Bender (born September 8, 1961) is a former American football running back who played five seasons in the Canadian Football League with the Toronto Argonauts, Hamilton Tiger-Cats, Saskatchewan Roughriders and Winnipeg Blue Bombers. He played college football at Kent State University.

Professional career

Toronto Argonauts
Bender was signed by the Toronto Argonauts in 1984 and played for the team from 1984 to 1985. He was released by the team on June 21, 1986.

Hamilton Tiger-Cats
Bender signed with the Hamilton Tiger-Cats and played for them during the 1986 season, winning the 74th Grey Cup. He also earned CFL East All-Star honors after recording 618 yards on 8 rushing touchdowns in twelve games.

Saskatchewan Roughriders
Bender played for the Saskatchewan Roughriders in 1987.

Winnipeg Blue Bombers
Bender played for the Winnipeg Blue Bombers in 1988, winning the 76th Grey Cup.

References

External links
Just Sports Stats

Living people
1961 births
Players of American football from Detroit
American football running backs
Canadian football running backs
African-American players of American football
African-American players of Canadian football
Kent State Golden Flashes football players
Toronto Argonauts players
Hamilton Tiger-Cats players
Saskatchewan Roughriders players
Winnipeg Blue Bombers players
21st-century African-American people
20th-century African-American sportspeople